Göte Emil Wälitalo (born July 18, 1956) is a Swedish former professional ice hockey goaltender.

Wälitalo began his career with his hometown team Kiruna AIF before joining IF Björklöven in 1980. He would spend the next eight season with Björklöven before retiring in 1988. He later head coach of Team Kiruna, IF Björklöven's J20 team and Tegs SK. He also became an assistant coach of Sweden's under-18 team as well as a goaltending coach for Björklöven and Vännäs HC.

Walitalo also played for the Swedish national team and won a bronze medal at the 1984 Winter Olympics.

References

External links 

1956 births
Living people
IF Björklöven players
Ice hockey players at the 1984 Winter Olympics
Olympic ice hockey players of Sweden
Swedish ice hockey goaltenders
Olympic bronze medalists for Sweden
Olympic medalists in ice hockey
Medalists at the 1984 Winter Olympics